Shenzhen Stadium (Simplified Chinese: 深圳市体育场) is a multi-purpose stadium in Futian, Shenzhen, Guangdong, China. It is currently used mostly for association football matches. The stadium holds 32,500 people, and is the home of Shenzhen F.C.

It was built in June 1993, at a cost of 141 million RMB.

External links 
 Shenzhen Stadium at WorldStadiums.com

Football venues in China
Athletics (track and field) venues in China
Sports venues in Shenzhen
Multi-purpose stadiums in China